is a Japanese former figure skater. She won the 2009 Ondrej Nepela Memorial.

Programs

Competitive highlights

References

External links

 
 Tracings.net profile

1991 births
Living people
Japanese female single skaters
People from Tokyo